William or Bill Bradford may refer to:

Arts and entertainment
William Bradford (painter) (1823–1892), American artist and Arctic explorer
William Bradford (architect) (1845–1919), British architect of breweries
William Bradford (cinematographer) (1905–1959), American cinematographer

Military
William Bradford (Plymouth soldier) (1624–1703), military commander of Plymouth during King Philip's War; son of Governor Bradford
William Bradford (soldier, born 1771) (1771–1826), U.S. Army officer
William Bradford (general) (1896–1965), U.S. Army general and Olympic equestrian
Bill Bradford (British Army officer) (1912–1996), British Army officer in World War II

Politics and law
William Bradford (governor) (1590–1657), English Governor of Plymouth Colony
William Bradford (Rhode Island politician) (1729–1808), U.S. Senator
William Bradford (Attorney General) (1755–1795), American lawyer and judge; second U.S. Attorney General
William G. Bradford (1925–2008), American diplomat
R. W. Bradford (Raymond William Bradford, 1947–2005), American political writer
William C. Bradford (born c. 1964), American lawyer and legal scholar

Sports
Bill Bradford (footballer) (1903–1984), English footballer
Bill Bradford (outfielder) (born 1913), American Negro leagues baseball player
Bill Bradford (pitcher) (1921–2000), American baseball player

Others
William Bradford (printer, born 1663) (1663–1752), English-born printer in Pennsylvania and New York
William Bradford (printer, born 1719) (1719–1791), American printer, grandson of the above
William R. Bradford (1933–2019), American general authority of The Church of Jesus Christ of Latter-day Saints
William Bradford (murderer) (1948–2008), American convicted murderer and possible serial killer

Other uses
William Bradford Academy, the former name of a secondary school in Leicestershire, England

See also
William Bradford Reed (1806–1876), American lawyer, diplomat, journalist, academic

Bradford, William